The Shishmaref Inlet (Inupiaq: Qigiqtam Imaġzrua) is a coastal lagoon on the Chukchi Sea-facing shores of Alaska. It is 5 miles in length.

The location of the Shishmaref Inlet is SW 17 mi. to the SW from Sarichef Island, at the mouth of the Serpentine River, Kotzebue-Kobuk Low.

This lagoon was named Shishmaref Bay in 1816 by explorer Lt. Otto von Kotzebue, of the Imperial Russian Navy, after Capt. Lt. Gleb Shishmaryov who accompanied him on his exploration.

References
 Description and location - USGS

Lagoons of Alaska
Bodies of water of Nome Census Area, Alaska